Arsi may refer to:
 Arsi Province, a former province of Ethiopia
 Arsi Zone, a zone within the Oromia region of Ethiopia
 Arsi Mountains National Park in Arsi Zone
 Arsi Oromo, an Ethiopian clan of the Oromo people
 Arsi language, a dialect of Oromo language
 Ārśi, the original name, in the Tocharian languages for the city of Agni (Chinese Yanqi), later Karasahr as well as the surrounding area and its inhabitants
 ARSI – Amateur Radio Society of India

Language and nationality disambiguation pages